Say You'll Be Mine may refer to:

"Say You'll Be Mine" (Christopher Cross song), single by Christopher Cross from his self-titled 1980 album Christopher Cross
"Say You'll Be Mine" (Amy Grant song), a single by Amy Grant from her 1994 album House of Love
"Say You'll Be Mine" (Steps song), Side A of a Double-A side single "Say You'll Be Mine/Better the Devil You Know" by Steps from their 1999 album Steptacular
"Say You'll be Mine", a 2008 song by Kitty, Daisy & Lewis

See also
Say Forever You'll Be Mine, 1975 duet album by Porter Wagoner and Dolly Parton, and the title track from the album